is a 1995 fighting game developed and published by Culture Brain for the Super Famicom exclusively in Japan. It is part of the Super Chinese series, but is not in the main series of the games. Fighter allows players to fight in fighting game battles using characters from the Super Chinese games, including Jack and Ryu.

This game is the first Super Chinese Fighter game. Two others, Super Chinese Fighter GB and Super Chinese Fighter EX, were released after this game, although none of these games were released in North America.

Characters
Jack
Ryu
Lin Lin
Poi
Donchyu
Robo No Hana
Astro Joe
Genziro
Kamanchyi
Gofire
Syuba
Bokuchin
Kyon2see

Trivia
Jack, Ryu, Robo No Hana, Gofire, and Bokuchin would go on to cross over in the Hiryu No Ken series, in which Robo No Hana and Bokuchin would appear in Flying Dragon (SD Hiryu No Ken Twin) for the Nintendo 64 while Jack, Ryu, and Gofire would later appear with the two in the game's Japan-only sequel SD Hiryu No Ken Densetsu.

External links
Super Chinese Fighter at GameFAQs

References 

 
1995 video games
Japan-exclusive video games
Super Nintendo Entertainment System games
Super Nintendo Entertainment System-only games
Video games developed in Japan
Multiplayer and single-player video games